Peter Rost may refer to:

 Peter Rost (doctor) (born 1959), former vice president of the drug company Pfizer
 Peter Rost (politician) (born 1930), British Conservative Party MP 1970–1992
 Peter Rost (handballer) (born 1951), German team handball player